KJPW (1390 AM) is a radio station broadcasting a news talk information format. Licensed to Waynesville, Missouri, United States, the station is currently owned by Alpha Media, through licensee Alpha Media Licensee LLC, and features programming from Fox News Radio.

KJPW and its sister station, KFBD-FM, are the dominant news radio providers in the Pulaski County area, which includes Fort Leonard Wood, Waynesville, and St. Robert.

The stations compete with the only other station broadcasting from Pulaski County, KFLW Radio, owned by the Lebanon Daily Record and working locally from the St. Robert offices of the Pulaski County Mirror weekly newspaper. The top-rated show on the station is currently The Rush Limbaugh Show, from 11am to 2pm central.

History
Pulaski County Broadcasters, Inc. assigned the license for the station to Ozark Broadcasting, Inc. on September 29, 2003. Also assigned was the license for sister station KJPW-FM (now KOZQ-FM), in a transaction valued at $735,000. Ozark assigned the licenses for both stations, as well as KBNN, KFBD-FM, KJEL, and KIIK, to GoodRadio.TV, LLC on May 9, 2007. On September 10, 2007, the licenses for all six stations were further assigned to the current owner, Waynesville/Lebanon License Co, LLC, on a pro forma basis.

Gary Knehans was honored by the Waynesville City Council on Sept. 19, 2013, for fifty years of service as a reporter with the radio station. Knehans was hired by the original owners of the radio station about half a year after it went on the air, and now serves as operations manager for KJPW/KFBD as well as two other stations.

In December 2013, GoodRadio.TV and its subsidiaries merged into Digity, LLC. Effective February 25, 2016, Digity and its 124 radio stations were acquired by Alpha Media for $264 million.

Line-up
Weekdays:
 5a-8a Good Day Show with Doug Stephens
 8a-11a Brian Kilmead
 11a-2p Markley, Van Camp And Robbins
 2p-5p Tom Sullivan
 5p-8p Mark Levine
 8p Business Talk Radio

References

External links

JPW
News and talk radio stations in the United States
Pulaski County, Missouri
Alpha Media radio stations